Kohala Mountain Road, designated Route 250, travels upon the Kohala mountain on the island of Hawaii in Hawaii County, Hawaii, United States.

Route description

Route 19 at this point is known as Hawaii Belt Road, or Kawaihae Road.

Major junctions

See also

 List of state highways in Hawaii
 List of highways numbered 311

References

External links

Roads in Hawaii
Transportation in Hawaii County, Hawaii